Kasey Scott Carpenter is an American politician from Georgia. Carpenter is a Republican member of Georgia House of Representatives for District 4.

Education 
In 2001, Carpenter earned a Bachelor of Arts degree in finance from University of Georgia.

Career 
Carpenter is a restaurant owner in Georgia.
In 2017, Carpenter won the election and became a member of the Georgia House of Representatives for District 4. He is a member of the Republican Party.  In January 2022, Speaker David Ralston appointed Carpenter to serve as Chairman of the House Creative Arts & Entertainment Committee.

Personal life 
Carpenter's wife is Julie Carpenter. They have four children.

References

External links 
 Kasey Carpenter at ballotpedia.org

Republican Party members of the Georgia House of Representatives
21st-century American politicians
Living people
People from Dalton, Georgia
1978 births